The Norton Commando John Player Special was a 1974 limited edition version of the Norton Commando that was fitted with bodywork styled to reproduce the successful Formula 750 works racers that were sponsored by cigarette manufacturers John Player & Sons. The machine was based on the Mk2A 850 Commando. Around 200 of these machines were made, of which about 120 were exported to the US. The bike was expensive, selling for around $3,000 in the US, $500 more than a standard Commando.

Background
Dennis Poore, chairman of Norton had instigated the formation of a works racing team to enter Formula 750 events in late 1971 with sponsorship from John Player to promote their John Player Special brand of cigarettes. Design and development engineer Peter Williams, who was also their works rider, was the chief designer of the racers. 

The team had some success in 1972 and in 1973, on a newly designed bike, the team won 14 international races. These included three races at the Transatlantic Trophy and the Formula 750cc Isle of Man TT. In British domestic races, Dave Croxford won the British 750 cc Championship and Williams came second in the MCN Superbike Championship.

To capitalise on the success of the race bikes, Norton decided to produce a variant of the Commando styled to resemble the racers.

Design

Norton's stylist/product designer, Mike Oldfield, was given the design responsibility for the bike. Initially it was to have been a cafe racer, but when the works team started entering endurance races with an abbreviated fairing fitted with twin headlights, the design direction changed. 

A styling prototype was built from a Mk2A Commando with the bodywork hand-formed out of aluminium and moulds for the fibreglass bodywork made. Fibreglass petrol tanks were illegal at the time so an extended Roadster tank was used with the fibreglass covering it. The single seat had a large hump which had a storage compartment inside. The fairing was made by Avon, who made the fairings for the racers, and was fitted with twin  headlights and swooped down to cover the sides of the engine. Rearsets and clip-on handlebars were fitted and the exhaust finished in black chrome.

Production
Production started in late 1973 and the first bikes were in the dealer's showroom in April 1974. The machines were assembled on the Commando production lines in Andover and Wolverhampton.

Although most of the bikes were fitted with the 850 engine, the Norton catalogue did list the model being available with the short-stroke engine used on the 1974 racer, either in full race tune or detuned for road use. It is not known how many 750s were made.

Norton had planned to produce 1,000 machines but this was optimistic, and only around 200 machines were produced in total with about 120 going to the US.

References

Bibliography

External links

 

Commando John Player Special
Motorcycles introduced in 1974
Motorcycles powered by straight-twin engines